Swiss-Belhotel International is an international hospitality company founded in 1987 by Peter Gautschi and headquartered in Hong Kong. It is one of the world's hotel management groups. Swiss-Belhotel International has been led by its President and Chairman, Gavin Faull, for the last 27 years. 

With more than 125 hotels, resorts and projects, Swiss-Belhotel International manages properties in 19 countries, including Hong Kong, China, Indonesia, Malaysia, Philippines, Vietnam, Thailand, Bahrain, Egypt, Iraq, Kuwait, Oman,  Qatar, Saudi Arabia, United Arab Emirates, Australia, New Zealand, Switzerland, Tanzania. In addition to the Group Corporate Head Office in Hong Kong, Swiss-Belhotel International's worldwide operations are supported by Group / Regional Operations and Development Offices in Shanghai (China), Hanoi (Vietnam), Jakarta, Surabaya, Bali (Indonesia), Baden (Switzerland), Sydney (Australia), Auckland (New Zealand), Dubai (United Arab Emirates).

Brands 
 Grand Swiss-Belhotel
 Grand Swiss-Belresort
 Māua
 Bohemia
 Swiss-Belhotel
 Swiss-Belresort
 Swiss-Belboutique
 Swiss-Belsuites
 Swiss-Belvillas
 Swiss-Belresidences
 Swiss-Belinn
 Swiss-Belcourt
 Swiss-Belexpress
 Zest Plus 
 Zest 
 Zest Ok

Hotels

The York by Swiss-Belhotel Sydney Australia

Swiss-Belhotel Seef, Bahrain
 Swiss-Belresidences Juffair
 Swiss-Belsuites Admiral Juffair
 Grand Swiss-Belhotel Waterfront, Seef

Hotel Ciputra Cibubur 
 Hotel Ciputra Jakarta
 Hotel Ciputra World Surabaya
 Hotel Ciputra Semarang
 Swiss-Belinn Cibitung
 Swiss-Belinn Tunjungan, Surabaya
 Swiss-Belhotel Harbour Bay, Batam
 Zest Harbour Bay, Batam
 Swiss-Belhotel Balikpapan
 Swiss-Belresort Belitung
 Swiss-Belhotel Merauke
 Swiss-Belinn Singkawang
 Swiss-Belinn Balikpapan
 Swiss-Belinn Cikarang
 Swiss-Belhotel Solo
 Swiss-Belhotel Papua, Jayapura
 Swiss-Belinn Panakkukang Makassar
 Zest Bogor 
 Swiss-Belinn Legian 
 Swiss-Belhotel Borneo Samarinda
 Swiss-Belhotel Pondok Indah
 Swiss-Belhotel Jambi
 Swiss-Belresidences Rasuna Epicentrum
 Swiss-Belhotel Lampung
 Swiss-Belresort Watu Jimbar, Sanur
 Swiss-Belhotel Rainforest Kuta 
 Swiss-Belresort Pecatu, Bali 
 Swiss-Belhotel Bogor 
 Swiss-Belhotel Cendrawasih Biak 
 Swiss-Belinn Gajah Mada, Medan
 Swiss-Belhotel Ambon
 Swiss-Belinn Malang
 Swiss-Belhotel Kendari 
 Swiss-Belinn Luwuk
 Swiss-Belresidences Kalibata 
 Swiss-Belhotel Danum Palangkaraya
 Swiss-Belhotel Borneo Banjarmasin
 Swiss-Belhotel Makassar
 Swiss-Belhotel Tuban
 Zest Jemursari, Surabaya
 Swiss-Belhotel Pangkalpinang
 Zest Airport, Jakarta 
 Zest Yogyakarta
 Swiss-Belhotel Serpong
 Swiss-Belinn Airport, Jakarta
 Swiss-Belhotel Silae Palu
 Swiss-Belhotel Sorong
 Zest Legian
 Swiss-Belinn Baloi, Batam
 Swiss-Belinn Simatupang, Jakarta 
 Swiss-Belinn Wahid Hasyim
 Swiss-Belinn Karawang
 Swiss-Belhotel Airport, Jakarta
 Swiss-Belhotel Mangga Besar
 Swiss-Belinn Airport, Surabaya
 Swiss-Belexpress Cilegon
 Swiss-Belinn Modern Cikande
 Swiss-Belhotel Manokwari
 Swiss-Belhotel Tarakan
 Swiss-Belhotel Maleosan Manado
 Zest Parang Raja
 Swiss-Belexpress Kuta, Bali
 Zest Bandung
 Swiss-Belinn Bogor 
 Swiss-Belhotel Cirebon
 Swiss-Belinn Kemayoran
 Swiss-Belinn Medan
 Swiss-Belboutique Yogyakarta
 Swiss-Belinn Manyar, Surabaya
 Swiss-Belresort Dago Heritage 
 Swiss-Belinn Ska Pekanbaru
 Swiss-Belinn Saripetojo Solo
 Māua Nusa Penida, Bali 
 Swiss-Belcourt Kupang

Swiss-Belboutique Bneid Al Gar

Swiss-Belhotel Kuantan

Swiss-Belresort Coronet Peak, Queenstown
 Swiss-Belsuites Victoria Park, Auckland
 Swiss-Belboutique Napier
 Swiss-Belsuites Pounamu, Queenstown

Swiss-Belinn Muscat

Swiss-Belhotel Blulane
 Valero Grand Suites by Swiss-Belhotel

Swiss-Belinn Doha Qatar

Swiss-Belhotel Du Parc

Swiss-Belresort Tuyen Lam Da Lat

External links 
 

Hotel chains in Indonesia
Hospitality companies of Hong Kong
Hospitality companies established in 1987